In mathematics, specifically category theory, a functor is a mapping between categories.  Functors were first considered in algebraic topology, where algebraic objects (such as the fundamental group) are associated to topological spaces, and maps between these algebraic objects are associated to continuous maps between spaces.   Nowadays, functors are used throughout modern mathematics to relate various categories.   Thus, functors are important in all areas within mathematics to which category theory is applied.

The words category and functor were borrowed by mathematicians from the philosophers Aristotle and Rudolf Carnap, respectively.  The latter used functor in a linguistic context;
see function word.

Definition 

Let C and D be categories. A functor F from C to D is a mapping that
 associates each object  in C to an object  in D,
 associates each morphism  in C to a morphism  in D such that the following two conditions hold:
  for every object  in C,

That is, functors must preserve identity morphisms and composition of morphisms.

Covariance and contravariance 

There are many constructions in mathematics that would be functors but for the fact that they "turn morphisms around" and "reverse composition". We then define a contravariant functor F from C to D as a mapping that
associates each object  in C with an object  in D,
associates each morphism  in C with a morphism  in D such that the following two conditions hold:
 for every object  in C,

Note that contravariant functors reverse the direction of composition.

Ordinary functors are also called covariant functors in order to distinguish them from contravariant ones. Note that one can also define a contravariant functor as a covariant functor on the opposite category . Some authors prefer to write all expressions covariantly. That is, instead of saying  is a contravariant functor, they simply write  (or sometimes ) and call it a functor.

Contravariant functors are also occasionally called cofunctors.

There is a convention which refers to "vectors"—i.e., vector fields, elements of the space of sections  of a tangent bundle —as "contravariant" and to "covectors"—i.e., 1-forms, elements of the space of sections  of a cotangent bundle —as "covariant". This terminology is contrary to the one used in category theory because it is the covectors that have pullbacks in general and are thus contravariant, whereas vectors in general are covariant since they can be pushed forward. See also Covariance and contravariance of vectors.

Opposite functor 
By definition,  maps objects and morphisms in the identical way as does . Note that, following the property of opposite category, .

Bifunctors and multifunctors 
A bifunctor (also known as a binary functor) is a functor whose domain is a product category. For example, the Hom functor is of the type . It can be seen as a functor in two arguments. The Hom functor is a natural example; it is contravariant in one argument, covariant in the other.

A multifunctor is a generalization of the functor concept to n variables.

Properties 
Two important consequences of the functor axioms are:
 F transforms each commutative diagram in C into a commutative diagram in D;
 if f is an isomorphism in C, then F(f) is an isomorphism in D.

One can compose functors, i.e. if F is a functor from A to B and G is a functor from B to C then one can form the composite functor  from A to C. Composition of functors is associative where defined. Identity of composition of functors is the identity functor. This shows that functors can be considered as morphisms in categories of categories, for example in the category of small categories.

A small category with a single object is the same thing as a monoid: the morphisms of a one-object category can be thought of as elements of the monoid, and composition in the category is thought of as the monoid operation. Functors between one-object categories correspond to monoid homomorphisms. So in a sense, functors between arbitrary categories are a kind of generalization of monoid homomorphisms to categories with more than one object.

Examples 
 Diagram For categories C and J, a diagram of type J in C is a covariant functor .
 (Category theoretical) presheafFor categories C and J, a J-presheaf on C is a contravariant functor .In the special case when J is Set, the category of sets and functions, D is called a presheaf on C.
 Presheaves (over a topological space) If X is a topological space, then the open sets in X form a partially ordered set Open(X) under inclusion. Like every partially ordered set, Open(X) forms a small category by adding a single arrow  if and only if . Contravariant functors on Open(X) are called presheaves on X. For instance, by assigning to every open set U the associative algebra of real-valued continuous functions on U, one obtains a presheaf of algebras on X.
 Constant functor The functor  which maps every object of C to a fixed object X in D and every morphism in C to the identity morphism on X. Such a functor is called a constant or selection functor.
  A functor that maps a category to that same category; e.g., polynomial functor.
  In category C, written 1C or idC, maps an object to itself and a morphism to itself. The identity functor is an endofunctor.
 Diagonal functor The diagonal functor is defined as the functor from D to the functor category DC which sends each object in D to the constant functor at that object.
 Limit functor For a fixed index category J, if every functor  has a limit (for instance if C is complete), then the limit functor  assigns to each functor its limit. The existence of this functor can be proved by realizing that it is the right-adjoint to the diagonal functor and invoking the Freyd adjoint functor theorem. This requires a suitable version of the axiom of choice. Similar remarks apply to the colimit functor (which assigns to every functor its colimit, and is covariant).
 Power sets functor The power set functor  maps each set to its power set and each function  to the map which sends  to its image . One can also consider the contravariant power set functor which sends  to the map which sends  to its inverse image  For example, if  then .
  The map which assigns to every vector space its dual space and to every linear map its dual or transpose is a contravariant functor from the category of all vector spaces over a fixed field to itself.
 Fundamental group Consider the category of pointed topological spaces, i.e. topological spaces with distinguished points. To every topological space X with distinguished point x0, one can define the fundamental group based at x0, denoted . This is the group of homotopy classes of loops based at x0, with the group operation of concatenation. If  is a morphism of pointed spaces, then every loop in X with base point x0 can be composed with f to yield a loop in Y with base point y0. We thus obtain a functor from the category of pointed topological spaces to the category of groups. In the category of topological spaces (without distinguished point), one considers homotopy classes of generic curves, but they cannot be composed unless they share an endpoint. Thus one has the fundamental groupoid instead of the fundamental group, and this construction is functorial.
 Algebra of continuous functions A contravariant functor from the category of topological spaces (with continuous maps as morphisms) to the category of real associative algebras is given by assigning to every topological space X the algebra C(X) of all real-valued continuous functions on that space. Every continuous map  induces an algebra homomorphism  by the rule  for every φ in C(Y).
 Tangent and cotangent bundles The map which sends every differentiable manifold to its tangent bundle and every smooth map to its derivative is a covariant functor from the category of differentiable manifolds to the category of vector bundles. Doing this constructions pointwise gives the tangent space, a covariant functor from the category of pointed differentiable manifolds to the category of real vector spaces. Likewise, cotangent space is a contravariant functor, essentially the composition of the tangent space with the dual space above.
 Group actions/representations Every group G can be considered as a category with a single object whose morphisms are the elements of G. A functor from G to Set is then nothing but a group action of G on a particular set, i.e. a G-set. Likewise, a functor from G to the category of vector spaces, VectK, is a linear representation of G. In general, a functor  can be considered as an "action" of G on an object in the category C. If C is a group, then this action is a group homomorphism.
 Lie algebras Assigning to every real (complex) Lie group its real (complex) Lie algebra defines a functor.
 Tensor products If C denotes the category of vector spaces over a fixed field, with linear maps as morphisms, then the tensor product  defines a functor  which is covariant in both arguments.
 Forgetful functors The functor  which maps a group to its underlying set and a group homomorphism to its underlying function of sets is a functor.  Functors like these, which "forget" some structure, are termed forgetful functors. Another example is the functor  which maps a ring to its underlying additive abelian group. Morphisms in Rng (ring homomorphisms) become morphisms in Ab (abelian group homomorphisms).
 Free functors Going in the opposite direction of forgetful functors are free functors. The free functor  sends every set X to the free group generated by X. Functions get mapped to group homomorphisms between free groups. Free constructions exist for many categories based on structured sets. See free object.
 Homomorphism groups To every pair A, B of abelian groups one can assign the abelian group Hom(A, B) consisting of all group homomorphisms from A to B. This is a functor which is contravariant in the first and covariant in the second argument, i.e. it is a functor  (where Ab denotes the category of abelian groups with group homomorphisms). See Hom functor.
 Representable functors We can generalize the previous example to any category C. To every pair X, Y of objects in C one can assign the set  of morphisms from X to Y. This defines a functor to Set which is contravariant in the first argument and covariant in the second, i.e. it is a functor . Functors like these are called representable functors. An important goal in many settings is to determine whether a given functor is representable.

Relation to other categorical concepts 
Let C and D be categories. The collection of all functors from C to D forms the objects of a category: the functor category. Morphisms in this category are natural transformations between functors.

Functors are often defined by universal properties; examples are the tensor product, the direct sum and direct product of groups or vector spaces, construction of free groups and modules, direct and inverse limits. The concepts of limit and colimit generalize several of the above.

Universal constructions often give rise to pairs of adjoint functors.

Computer implementations 

Functors sometimes appear in functional programming. For instance, the programming language Haskell has a class Functor where fmap is a polytypic function used to map functions (morphisms on Hask, the category of Haskell types) between existing types to functions between some new types.

See also 

 Functor category
 Kan extension
 Pseudofunctor

Notes

References 
 .

External links 

 
 see  and the variations discussed and linked to there.
 André Joyal, CatLab, a wiki project dedicated to the exposition of categorical mathematics
  formal introduction to category theory.
 J. Adamek, H. Herrlich, G. Stecker, Abstract and Concrete Categories-The Joy of Cats 
 Stanford Encyclopedia of Philosophy: "Category Theory" — by Jean-Pierre Marquis. Extensive bibliography.
 List of academic conferences on category theory
 Baez, John, 1996,"The Tale of n-categories." An informal introduction to higher order categories.
 WildCats is a category theory package for Mathematica. Manipulation and visualization of objects, morphisms, categories, functors, natural transformations, universal properties.
 The catsters, a YouTube channel about category theory.
 Video archive of recorded talks relevant to categories, logic and the foundations of physics.
Interactive Web page which generates examples of categorical constructions in the category of finite sets.